Pranav Gupta (born 18 December 1993) is an Indian cricketer who plays for Jammu and Kashmir. He made his first-class debut on 23 November 2015 in the 2015–16 Ranji Trophy. In December 2018, he was one of six cricketers for Jammu and Kashmir to be included in the auction ahead of the 2019 Indian Premier League.

References

External links
 

1993 births
Living people
Indian cricketers
Jammu and Kashmir cricketers
People from Madhya Pradesh